A large variety of dance companies exist in Canada, encompassing a wide tradition of dances that represent both its many indigenous cultures, as well as that of its European-descended population.

Ballet companies and dance groups 

Some Ballet companies include the Royal Winnipeg Ballet, the National Ballet of Canada (which is based in Toronto), Ballet Jörgen Canada (also based in Toronto), Les Grands Ballets Canadiens (based in Montreal), the Alberta Ballet (based in Calgary), Ballet BC (based in Vancouver), Ballet Kelowna, Ballet du Printemps (also based in Vancouver), Ballet Victoria, Canadian Pacific Ballet (based in Victoria), and the Goh Ballet in Vancouver.  There are also many modern dance companies including Toronto Dance Theatre, O Vertigo in Montreal, Compagnie Marie Chouinard in Montreal, Par B.l.eux founded by Benoît Lachambre in Montreal, Danny Grossman Dance Company in Toronto, The Chimera Project in Toronto, Mocean Dance in Halifax and Winnipeg's Contemporary Dancers.

The largest company in the country is The National Ballet of Canada. The Royal Winnipeg is the second oldest and longest continuously running ballet company in North America. It was the first ballet company in the Common Wealth to receive the Royal charter. Canada is home to hundreds of amateur Ukrainian dance groups as well as professional and semi-professional companies such as the Cheremosh Ukrainian Dance Company in Edmonton.

Ballroom dance in Canada 

Canada is an active member of two largest ballroom dance associations, WDSF (national branch called Canada DanceSport) and WDC. It hosts such noticeable annual dance competitions as Snowball Classic and La Classique du Quebec.

Indigenous Dance

The Red River Jig is a traditional dance of the Canadian Métis. The origins of the dance lie in the traditional dances of the First Nations, French, English, Scots, and Orcadian peoples from whom the Métis Nation was born.[1] The name refers to the Red River of the North which forms the border between North Dakota and Minnesota (USA) flowing northward through Winnipeg, Manitoba, Canada to Hudson's Bay.

Prominent Canadian Dancers

Canadian dancers have been recognised in international competitions.

 Alain Doucet and Anik Jolicoeur-Doucet were four time professional ten dance world champions.
 Maurizio Vescovo and Andra Vaidilaite were professional Latin World Cup champions 2013 in Moscow.
 Anton Belyaev and Antoaneta Popova won third place in World Ten Dance Championship 2013 in Vienna.
 Vadim Garbuzov was Canadian youth Standard champion 2004 and Canadian youth Latin champion 2003 with Nadiya Dyatlova. Then with Kathrin Menzinger he became 2015 world champion in Latin show and world champion in standard show. 
 Richard Lifshitz and Greta Korju: World Champions 2013  U-19 and U-21 WDC AL Youth Latin (Paris, France), Canadian Champions 2013 U-21 and Youth Latin, North American Champions 2013 16+ and Youth Latin.

Jacqueline Lemieux Prize 
The Canada Council for the Arts administers the Jacqueline Lemieux Prize that recognizes outstanding contributions to dance in Canada from established dance professionals.

The prize was established in 1980 and is awarded in memory of Jacqueline Lemieux and her contribution to the development of Canadian dance. Lemieux and her husband Lawrence Gradus co-founded a summer school in Lennoxville, Quebec. She was a teacher, administrator, and member of the Canada Council for the Arts’ Advisory Panel.

The Lemieux Prize has rewarded performers, choreographers, teachers, film makers, journalists, theatre technicians, and community workers. The prize winners come from dance forms that include ballet, contemporary, classical Indian dance, flamenco, and indigenous dance forms. Recipients include Robert Desrosiers, Daniel Léveillé, Jennifer Mascall, Louise Bédard, Michael Montanaro, Lucie Boissinot, Marie Chouinard, Cylla Von Tiedemann, Sylvain Émard, Jo Lechay, Elizabeth Langley, Benoit Lachambre, David Earle, Bill Coleman, Judith Marcuse, Philip Szporer, Crystal Pite, and Serge Bennethan.

References